The 1921–22 season was the 23rd season for FC Barcelona.

Events
Joan Gamper again took over presidency of the Club.

Results

External links

webdelcule.com
webdelcule.com

References

FC Barcelona seasons
Barcelona